The Battle of Vincy (or Vinchy, now Les Rues-des-Vignes) was a battle of the Frankish civil war of 715–18 fought near Cambrai, in the modern département of Nord. It was a contest between Charles Martel and the Austrasians on one side and the king of the Franks, Chilperic II, and his mayor of the palace, Ragenfrid, on the other.

After the Battle of Amblève in 716, King Chilperic and Ragenfrid returned defeated to Neustria. Instead of following them at once, Charles again used tactics he would use all his remaining life, in a successful military career. He took time to rally more men and prepare, before descending in full force. By the following spring, Martel had attracted enough support to confront the Neustrians. 

He chose where to provoke them to battle, and, at a place and time of his choosing. Charles eventually followed them and dealt them a serious blow at Vincy on 21 March 717. He pursued the fleeing king and mayor to Paris.

On this success, he proclaimed Clotaire IV king of Austrasia in opposition to Chilperic and deposed the bishop of Rheims, Rigobert, replacing him with one Milo. The defeated Chilperic II, and his mayor of the palace, Ragenfrid, were essentially broken after this battle.

Notes

Sources
Oman, Charles. The Dark Ages, 476–918. London: Rivingtons, 1914.

Vincy
Vincy
Aisne
Vincy
Vincy
717